Abu Theeb is the pseudonym of a leader of a Sunni group taking part in the Iraqi insurgency, operating north of Baghdad.

They are engaged in armed struggle against the forces of the US and the US-backed Iraqi government.  His group had a dispute with Al-Qaida over tactics in relation to the referendum on the Iraqi constitution in October 2005; they supported a boycott, and his group supported a "no" vote.  He also opposed Al-Qaida over indiscriminate attacks on Iraqi Shias.

During the time of the referendum a journalist from The Guardian spent five days with his group, and wrote a report.

External links
Guardian report
Washington Post report

Iraqi insurgency (2003–2011)
Iraqi Sunni Muslims
Year of birth missing (living people)
Living people
Rebel groups in Iraq